Pteroctopus is a genus of octopuses in the family Octopodidae.

Species
 Pteroctopus eurycephala * (Taki, 1964)
 Pteroctopus hoylei (Berry, 1909) – Pacific Fourhorn Octopus
 Pteroctopus keralensis * (Oommen, 1966) 
 Pteroctopus schmidti (Joubin, 1933) – Dana Octopus
 Pteroctopus tetracirrhus (Delle Chiaje, 1830 in 1823-1831) – Fourhorn Octopus or Atlantic Fourhorn Octopus
 Pteroctopus witjazi * Akimushkin, 1963

The species listed above with an asterisk (*) are taxon inquirendum and need further study to determine if they are valid species or synonyms.

References

External links

 

Octopodidae
Cephalopod genera